Visa requirements for Serbian citizens are administrative entry restrictions by the authorities of other states placed on citizens of the Republic of Serbia. As of 26 November 2022, Serbian citizens had visa-free or visa on arrival access to 136 countries and territories, ranking the Serbian passport 38th overall in terms of travel freedom according to the Henley Passport Index. The Serbian passport is still one of the 5 passports with the greatest improvement in rating since 2006, adding 103 countries to its visa-free list.

As of May 2019, Bosnia and Herzegovina, Brunei, Dominica, Grenada, Mauritius, Seychelles, Serbia and the United Arab Emirates are the only countries whose citizens may travel without a visa to China, Russia and the Schengen Area.

History
Before Serbia began issuing new biometric passports in 2008, its citizens travelled using old Federal Republic of Yugoslavia passport.

Until the 1990s, the Yugoslav passport has been described as highly sought-after commodity. As part of its non-aligned policies, the Yugoslav government signed numerous mutual agreements on visa-free entry from the mid-1960s. Eventually this applied to most states of the world, promoting the Yugoslav passport to "one of the most convenient in the world, as it was one of the few with which a person could travel freely through both the East and West" during the Cold War. Passport holders only required visas for six countries: the United States, West Germany, Greece, Israel, Albania and the People's Republic of China.

With the subsequent dissolution of Yugoslavia in the 1990s, the period of difficulties related to travel bureaucracy started for all successor states, including Serbia. From the 2000s onward, the situation has been significantly and constantly improving.

Recent
Serbia and Russia signed visa-free travel agreement in February 2009.

Serbia signed a visa-free agreement with Israel in September 2009.

The European Union Schengen area countries lifted visas for Serbia citizens in December 2009.

Serbia and Turkey mutually abolished visa regime in July 2010.

Serbia signed an agreement on the abolishment of visas with Kazakhstan in August 2010.

Serbia and Ukraine mutually abolished visas in May 2011.

Japan abolished visas for Serbia citizens in May 2011.

Serbia and Albania mutually abolished visas in July 2011.

In August 2013 agreement on visa-free travel with Brazil came into force.

In July 2014 agreement on visa-free travel with Mongolia came into force.

In August 2015 agreement on visa-free travel with Moldova came into force.

In April 2016 Indonesia abolished visas for Serbian citizens for a maximum stay of 30 days.

In January 2017, agreement on mutual visa free travel between China and Serbia entered into force.

In November 2017 Iran abolished visas for Serbian citizens but reversed its decision in October 2018.

Colombia abolished visas for Serbian citizens in February 2018.

Serbia and Kyrgyzstan mutually abolished visas on 8 November 2018.
 
Uzbekistan abolished visas for Serbia citizens on 21 January 2019.

United Arab Emirates abolished visas for Serbian citizens on 6 May 2019.

Barbados abolished visas for Serbian citizens in May 2019.

Suriname abolished visas for holders of Serbian passport in September 2019.

Armenia lifted visa requirements for Serbian citizens on 30 January 2020.

Serbia and Azerbaijan mutually abolished visas on 11 October 2021.

Serbia, as one of the initiators and creators of the Open Balkan, had already implemented visa free movements for the truckers and agriculture workers between Serbia, Albania & North Macedonia since 1 January 2022. 
The new Open Balkan zone between the three countries has been fully implemented since 1 January 2023, allowing all citizens to enjoy complete freedom of movement like EU citizens practice in the EU.

The Serbian government & Turkish government signed an agreement on 10 June 2022, allowing citizens of both countries to travel to each other's with just an ID card. The agreement is yet to be put in force as of March 2023. 

Serbia and Antigua and Barbuda signed an agreement on mutual visa exemption for ordinary passport holders on 11th of March 2023.

Future
Possible inclusion of Serbia in the Visa Waiver Program of the United States was proposed by Serbia in 2009. Serbian adjusted visa refusal rate remains above the threshold (3%).

The United Kingdom Embassy in Serbia announced that visas could be abolished for Serbian citizens in 2011. However, in 2013, the Home Office announced it had no intention of abolishing visas for Serbian citizens.

Serbia and Australia officials held talks on facilitation measures for the issuance of Australian visas for Serbian citizens in 2012.

In June 2014 New Zealand announced an introduction of a facilitated visa regime for Serbia citizens.

In November 2016 Serbia foreign minister held talks with Canada officials on the beginning of visa liberalisation for Serbian citizens.

In September 2021 Serbian foreign minister announced that Serbia and Guatemala are ready to mutually abolish visas.

Serbian government intends to sign reciprocal visa-free deals with Panama, Paraguay, Bahamas, Brunei, Bolivia, Mauritius, Malaysia, Venezuela and Guatemala

Serbian ministers of foreign affairs have also talked about visa liberalization with next countries : Jordan, Sri Lanka, Nicaragua, Mexico, Cape Verde, Comoros, Antigua and Barbuda, Vietnam., Saudi Arabia

Serbian authorities are also in process of signing visa-free deals for diplomatic passports with Zambia, Kenya, Ethiopia, Oman, Bangladesh, Turkmenistan, Tajikistan, Cambodia, Bhutan, Philippines, South Africa, Bahrain, Egypt, Lesotho, Togo, Qatar, and Mali

Due to regional interests of expanding the economic opportunities in cooperation with the governments of Serbia, Albania and North Macedonia, these three Western Balkan countries signed agreements to open their national borders to each other's citizens and products by 1 January 2023, without restrictions.

Visa requirements map

Visa requirements

Territories and disputed areas
Visa requirements for Serbian citizens for visits to various territories, disputed areas, partially recognised countries and restricted zones:

Diplomatic and official passports only

Kosovo

The Constitution of Serbia recognises Kosovo as Serbian sovereign territory. Nevertheless, in reality, the Serbian authorities do not exercise effective control over the territory. In an agreement, facilitating visa free travel to the Schengen area, Serbia agreed with the EU to form the Serbian Coordination Directorate, responsible for issuing Serbian passports to the Kosovo resident Serbian citizens. These passports are treated differently from the regular Serbian passports and their holders are required to obtain entry visas for most territories and countries for which holders of the regular Serbian passport do not require a visa. All Serbian citizens resident in Kosovo, regardless of their ethnicity, are entitled to these special passports.

The UN administration in Kosovo UNMIK used to issue its own travel documents with the last ones being issued in July 2008. This document was recognised by several countries, but was in general refused at borders. The UNMIK travel documents were valid for two years, consequently there are no longer any valid UNMIK travel documents in circulation. Serbia didn't recognise the validity of the UN issued document nor does it recognise the Kosovan passport, which is officially recognised  and is de facto accepted by other states.

Both Governments are actively negotiating various issues of mutual importance among which is what travel documents can be used for crossing between both countries.

Serbian ID as optional passport replacement 

Serbian identity cards can be used instead of a passport for travel to some regional countries that have signed special agreements with the Serbian Government. Not all Serbian IDs feature contact-less RFID chips, so some are not fully ICAO9303 compliant biometric travel documents.

Non-visa restrictions

See also

 Visa policy of Serbia
 List of passports
 Serbian nationality law
 Serbian passport

References and Notes
References

Notes

External links
 Ministry of Foreign Affairs

Serbia
Foreign relations of Serbia